Omnibus may refer to:

Film and television 
 Omnibus (film)
 Omnibus (broadcast), a compilation of Radio or TV episodes
 Omnibus (UK TV series), an arts-based documentary programme
 Omnibus (U.S. TV series), an educational program
 Omnibus (talk show), an Italian series

Literature 
 Omnibus edition, a collection of literary works
 Omnibus Press, a book publisher
 Omnibus, a Marvel Comics character associated with the Leader

Music

Albums
 Omnibus (album), a 2006 album by Tarkio
 Omnibus, a 2008 album by Blue Mountain
 Omnibus, a 2001 album by Ruby Braff
 Omnibus: The 60s Singles As and Bs, a 1999 album by The Move

Songs
 "Omnibus", a song by the Move on the B-side of "Wild Tiger Woman"
 "Omnibus", a song by XTC from Nonsuch

Transport 
 Horse-drawn omnibus or horsebus, a large, enclosed and sprung horse-drawn vehicle used for passenger transport
 Motor omnibus or autobus, a road vehicle designed to carry passengers

Other uses
 Omnibus, an Italian illustrated magazine (1937–1939)
 Omnibus (painting), an 1892 painting by Anders Zorn
 Omnibus (survey), a research method used in interviewing
 OmniBus (video game), a 2016 video game
 Omnibus Promotion, a sound effects company
 Omnibus, a system bus on some varieties of PDP-8 computers
 Omnibus, a podcast hosted by John Roderick and Ken Jennings

See also 

 Anthology film, a feature film consisting of several different short films
 Bus (computing)
 Omnibus bill, a single legislative document containing many laws or amendments
 Omnibus claim, a patent claim which does not explicitly state any technical features of the product or process
 Omnibus clause
 Omnibus hearing
 Omnibus issue, in philately
 Omnibus law (Serbia), a Serbian law regarding Vojvodina
 Omnibus progression, a type of harmonic sequence
 Omnibus spending bill, a single legislative document that sets the budget of many government departments
 Omnibus test, a type of statistical test
 The man on the Clapham omnibus
 
 
 
 Bus (disambiguation)
 Omni (disambiguation)
 Omnia (disambiguation)